Goby Eberhardt (Frankfurt, 29 March 1852 – Lübeck, 13 September 1926) was a German violinist, teacher and composer.

Life
He studied with Friedrich Wilhelm Dietz a pupil of Spohr and later with Wilhelmj.
He started his career at the age of 12. He was leader of famous orchestras: Berna (1870), Bremen (1872), Hamburg (1880).
After a stroke in 1900 he concentrated in teaching

Works

Musical Works

Pedagogical Works
Violin-Cursus (Magdeburg, 1901)
Violin Schule: neue Methodik (Leipzig, 1905–8)
Die ersten Übungen im Violinspiel (Leipzig, 1907)
Materialen für den Anfangsunterricht (Leipzig, 1907)
Mein System des Übens für Violine und Klavier auf psycho-physiologischer Grundlage (Dresden, 1907)
Schule der Doppelgriffe (Leipzig, 1907)
Schule der Geläufigkeit (Berlin, 1907)
Tägliche Violin-Übungen für Anfänger (Berlin, 1907)
Tägliche Violinübungen für die Verbindung schwieriger Doppelgriffe (Leipzig, 1907)
Virtuosen Schule für Violine auf Grund des neuen Systems (Leipzig, 1908)
Studienmaterial zum neuen System des Übens (Dresden, 1909)
Tägliche Übungen in verschiedenen Intervallen (Leipzig, ?1923–4)
Der natürliche Weg zur höchsten Virtuosität (Leipzig, 1923–4)(with S. Eberhardt)

Sources
Alfred Grant Goodman's article in New Grove Dictionary of Music

Notes

External links
 

1852 births
1926 deaths
German composers
19th-century German musicians